William Salusbury (1519–1559) was an English politician.
 
He was a Member (MP) of the Parliament of England for Barnstaple in November 1554 and 1558. He was Mayor of Barnstaple in 1557–58.

References

1519 births
1559 deaths
Mayors of Barnstaple
Members of the Parliament of England (pre-1707) for Barnstaple
English MPs 1554–1555
English MPs 1558